The  Green Bay Packers season was their 55th season overall and their 53rd season in the National Football League. The defending division champions posted a 5–7–2 record under third-year head coach Dan Devine, earning them a third-place finish in the NFC Central division.

Offseason 
Pro Football Hall of Fame linebacker Ray Nitschke retired during training camp in late August. Bart Starr left as quarterbacks coach to other business interests, which included a network broadcasting position with CBS.

NFL draft

Roster

Regular season

Schedule 

Monday (September 17, November 26), Saturday (December 8)
Note: Intra-division opponents are in bold text.

Game summaries

Week 1

Week 4

Week 9

Week 12

Week 14

Standings

References 

 Sportsencyclopedia.com

Green Bay Packers seasons
Green Bay Packers
Green